Zamboanga del Sur's 1st congressional district is one of the two congressional districts of the Philippines in the province of Zamboanga del Sur. It has been represented in the House of Representatives since 1987. The district encompasses the northern half of the province consisting of its provincial capital city of Pagadian and the municipalities of Aurora, Dumingag, Josefina, Labangan, Mahayag, Midsalip, Molave, Ramon Magsaysay, Sominot, Tambulig and Tukuran. It is currently represented in the 18th Congress by Divina Grace Yu of the PDP–Laban.

Representation history

Election results

2019

Divina Grace Yu was the Incumbent.

2016

Victor Yu is the incumbent but ineligible for reelection. His party nominated his wife, Divina Grace Yu.

2013

Victor Yu was the incumbent.

2010

Victor Yu is the incumbent.

See also
Legislative districts of Zamboanga del Sur

References

Congressional districts of the Philippines
Politics of Zamboanga del Sur
1987 establishments in the Philippines
Congressional districts of Zamboanga Peninsula
Constituencies established in 1987